Dhoop Ki Deewar is a ZEE5 exclusive and Zindagi-original Pakistani drama web series. It is written by Umera Ahmad and directed by Haseeb Hassan. The web series has an ensemble cast including Sajal Aly and Ahad Raza Mir in lead roles while Zaib Rehman, Savera Nadeem, Samiya Mumtaz, Samina Ahmed, Manzar Sehbai in prominent roles. Set in the backdrop of Indo-Pak conflict, the web series depicts that how peace is better than war.
 
It is available for streaming on the OTT platform ZEE5 from 25 June 2021 with two episodes each Friday and finale airing on Independence Day weekend.

Cast 
 Ahad Raza Mir as Vishal Malhotra
 Sajal Aly as Sarah Sher Ali
 Samiya Mumtaz as Sunanda Malhotra, Vishal's mother
 Zaib Rehman as Shobha Malhotra, Vishal's grandmother
 Savera Nadeem as Amna Sher Ali, Sarah's mother
 Samina Ahmed as Safia Nasir Ali, Sarah's grandmother
 Annie Zaidi as Lubna Ansar, Junaid's mother
 Manzar Sehbai as Nasir Ali, Sarah's grandfather
 Salma Hassan as Ayesha, Sarah's aunt
 Lubna Aslam as Rabia
 Alyy Khan as Vijay Malhotra, Vishal's father
 Raza Talish as Junaid Ansar
 Adnan Jaffar as Sher Ali, Sarah's father
 Paras Masroor as Anurag
 Zoya Nasir as Neha Sharma
 Zara Tareen as Pratibha
 Anoushey Rania Khan as Nooriah Sher Ali
 Sami Khan

Production

Background and development
The web series was announced by Haseeb Hassan in mid-2019 with leading cast of Sajal Aly, Ahad Raza Mir, Samiya Mumtaz, Samina Ahmed, Savera Nadeem and Manzar Sehbai. In conservation with The News, Hassan revealed "Dhoop Ki Deewar is not a love story: it is a love-hate story based on the love-hate relationship between people of India and Pakistan.". The official trailer was released by ZEE5 on YouTube on 15 June 2021.

Filming
Principal photography began in August 2019. The shooting was carried out in Azad Kashmir, Lahore, Karachi and Swat District.

References 

Urdu-language television shows
ZEE5 original programming
2021 web series debuts
Pakistani drama television series
Zee Zindagi original programming